Mundara Koorang is an Australian Aboriginal artist, designer, teacher, elder, actor, and author.

Mundara was born in 1952 in the Eora (Sydney) NSW area and is descendant of the Gamilaroi people. Mundara’s grandmother, great grandmother and great-great grandmother were all born in the Barwon River, Brewarrina area.

In 2005 Mundara published a Dreamtime story entitled The Little Platypus and the Fire Spirit.

Footnotes

External links
 

1952 births
Living people
Gamilaraay
Artists from Sydney
Australian children's writers
Australian Aboriginal artists
Australian Aboriginal elders